is a funicular station in Ikoma, Nara Prefecture, Japan, on the Kintetsu Ikoma Cable Line.

Layout 

Hozanji Line
3 platforms for the Hozanji Line serve 2 tracks. The inner platform is used usually, but in the crowded season, it is for getting on and the outer ones are used for getting off.
Hozanji Line 1 for Toriimae (regular operation)
Hozanji Line 2 for Toriimae (in the crowded season and when there is no operation on Line 1)
Sanjo Line
2 platforms for the Sanjo Line serve a track. One of the platforms is used usually.
for Ikoma-Sanjo

Adjacent stations 

Railway stations in Japan opened in 1918
Railway stations in Nara Prefecture